Noam Zylberman (born June 30, 1973) is an Israeli-born Canadian voice actor.

Early life 
Zylberman was born in Haifa, Israel to Jewish parents. His family relocated to Canada when he was two years old. He attended Arlington Middle School and Vaughan Road Collegiate school in Toronto, and has an older sister, Ilana.

Career 
While growing up in Richmond Hill, Ontario, Zylberman booked his own audition for a Crunchie commercial at age ten, and had landed several voice acting jobs in animated TV series by the time he was 13 years old. He went on to provide voices for many characters on animated series such as The Raccoons, ALF Tales, Garbage Pail Kids, Sylvanian Families, and Care Bears.

He gained some notoriety playing the title role in The Outside Chance of Maximilian Glick, a coming-of-age feature film about being Jewish in a multicultural rural Manitoba town. In a year-end arts review for 1988, the Toronto Star's Sid Adilman called Zylberman "the best newcomer to English-Canadian movies this year". He was slated to reprise the role in a subsequent CBC Television series, Max Glick, but more than two years passed before production on the series started, and by that time he had grown too tall for the role.

In 1989, he played the role of Tom Bradshaw in the TV movie Last Train Home, and received a nomination for Best Young Actor in a Cable Special at the 12th Youth in Film Awards.

Voice acting credits
 Tommy (1985-1986) and Bentley Raccoon (1987-1990) in The Raccoons
 Fritz in the 1990 animated movie The Nutcracker Prince
 Curtis Shumway in ALF Tales
 Split Kit in Garbage Pail Kids
 Chip in Hello Kitty's Furry Tale Theater
 Billy Wagner in Popples
 Bobby in the Police Academy
 Rusty Wildwood in Sylvanian Families
 Buddy in Little Rosey
 Stoke in Iggy Arbuckle
 Tiger in the 1987 direct-to-video animated cartoon The Wild Puffalumps 
 Bookmice
 Babar
 Tales from the Cryptkeeper
 C.O.P.S.
 My Pet Monster 
 The Care Bears
 Star Wars: Droids 
Switch in KidsWorld Sports

Film acting credits
 Maximilian in The Outside Chance of Maximilian Glick
 Regan Thatcher in Love and Hate: The Story of Colin and Joanne Thatcher
 Tom Bradshaw in Tom Alone
 Arthur Bennett in A Town Torn Apart
 Tom Bradshaw in Last Train Home
 Poultry Boy in Lantern Hill
 Eric in The Long Road Home
 Double Standard

TV series acting credits
 Adderly
 Friday the 13th: The Series
 Katts and Dog
 Kung Fu: The Legend Continues
 My Secret Identity
 Riverdale
 T. and T.
 War of the Worlds

References

External links

1973 births
Living people
Jewish Canadian male actors
Canadian male voice actors
Canadian male child actors
Canadian male film actors
Canadian male television actors
Male actors from Ontario
Male actors from Haifa
people from Richmond Hill, Ontario
Israeli Jews
Israeli emigrants to Canada